Heinz Wöllner (25 July 1913 – 10 April 1945) was a German athlete. He competed in the men's triple jump at the 1936 Summer Olympics. He was killed in action during World War II.

References

External links

1913 births
1945 deaths
Athletes (track and field) at the 1936 Summer Olympics
German male triple jumpers
Olympic athletes of Germany
German military personnel killed in World War II